Pittosporum ( or ) is a genus of about 200 species of flowering plants in the family Pittosporaceae. The genus is probably Gondwanan in origin; its present range extends from Australasia, Oceania, eastern Asia and some parts of Africa. Citriobatus can be included here, but might be a distinct (though closely related) genus. They are commonly known as pittosporums or, more ambiguously, cheesewoods.

The species are trees and shrubs growing to 2–30 m tall. The leaves are spirally arranged or whorled, simple, with an entire or waved (rarely lobed) margin. The flowers are produced singly or in umbels or corymbs, each flower with five sepals and five petals; they are often sweetly scented. The fruit is a woody seed capsule, which bursts on ripening to release the numerous seeds. The seeds are coated with a sticky resinous substance. The genus is named after their sticky seeds, from the Greek meaning "pitch-seed".

Tarata (P. eugenioides) and kohuhu (P. tenuifolium) – both from New Zealand – and the Japanese cheesewood (P. tobira) from southern Japan are widely cultivated as ornamental plants in subtropical regions; pittosporums can also be grown indoors as bonsai. The petroleum nut (P. resiniferum) yields petroleum nut oil, which is sometimes proposed as biofuel; due to its excessive n-heptane content and consequent low octane rating, it is better suited as a source of n-heptane, which is otherwise produced from crude oil.

Many herbivores detest the resinous pittosporums, in particular their seeds, which will stick anywhere. But some animals eat them with relish, for example the kea (Nestor notabilis), which likes P. anomalum fruit and seeds. The cottony cushion scale (Icerya purchasi) is a common pest on ornamental pittosporums (in particular the New Zealand species); the sac fungus Nectriella pironii often infects Japanese cheesewood.

Selected species

 Pittosporum aliferum Tirel & Veillon
 Pittosporum angustifolium
 Pittosporum anomalum Laing & Gourlay
 Pittosporum arborescens Rich. ex A. Gray
 Pittosporum argentifolium Sherff – hōawa
 Pittosporum artense Guillaumin
 Pittosporum bicolor
 Pittosporum bracteolatum
 Pittosporum brevispinum
 Pittosporum ceylanicum
 Pittosporum collinum
 Pittosporum confertiflorum A.Gray – hōawa (Hawaii)
 Pittosporum coriaceum
 Pittosporum cornifolium – tāwhiri karo
 Pittosporum crassifolium – karo
 Pittosporum dallii
 Pittosporum daphniphylloides
 Pittosporum dasycaulon
 Pittosporum divaricatum
 Pittosporum ellipticum
 Pittosporum ellipticum subsp. serpentinum
 Pittosporum eriocarpum
 Pittosporum erioloma
 Pittosporum eugenioides A. Cunn. – tarata, lemonwood (New Zealand)
 Pittosporum fairchildii
 Pittosporum ferrugineum
 Pittosporum gatopense
 Pittosporum glabrum – hōawa
 Pittosporum goetzei
 Pittosporum gomonenense
 Pittosporum heterophyllum
 Pittosporum illicioides
 Pittosporum kirkii – Kirk's pittosporum, Kirk's kōhūhū, thick-leaved kohukohu
 Pittosporum lancifolium
 Pittosporum ligustrifolium
 Pittosporum linearifolium
 Pittosporum mackeei Tirel & Veillon (Ponérihouen area of New Caledonia)
 Pittosporum moluccanum
 Pittosporum multiflorum
 Pittosporum muricatum
 Pittosporum napaliense
 Pittosporum nativitatis
 Pittosporum obcordatum – heart-leaved kohuhu
 Pittosporum oreillyanum – O'Reilly's pittosporum
 Pittosporum ornatum
 Pittosporum orohenense
 Pittosporum paniense
 Pittosporum parvifolium
 Pittosporum patulum
 Pittosporum pauciflorum
 Pittosporum pentandrum
 Pittosporum phillyreoides – weeping pittosporum, willow pittosporum, butterbush, native apricot
 Pittosporum pickeringii
 Pittosporum raivavaeense
 Pittosporum rapense
 Pittosporum rarotongense
 Pittosporum resiniferum – petroleum nut
 Pittosporum revolutum – rough-fruited pittosporum, wild yellow jasmine, yellow pittosporum, Brisbane laurel
 Pittosporum rhombifolium (now Auranticarpa rhombifolia) – Queensland pittosporum, diamond pittosporum, Hollywood
 Pittosporum rhytidocarpum
 Pittosporum rubiginosum
 Pittosporum senacia
 Pittosporum silamense
 Pittosporum spinescens
 Pittosporum stenophyllum
 Pittosporum taitense
 Pittosporum tanianum
 Pittosporum tenuifolium – kōhūhū, kohukohu, black matipo (New Zealand)
 Pittosporum terminalioides
 Pittosporum tobira (Murray) Aiton fil. – Japanese cheesewood, Japanese mock orange (Japan, China, and Korea)
 Pittosporum trilobum
 Pittosporum turneri
 Pittosporum undulatum – sweet pittosporum, Australian cheesewood, native daphne, mock orange (east coast of Australia)
 Pittosporum venulosum F.Muell.
 Pittosporum virgatum
 Pittosporum viridulatum
 Pittosporum viridiflorum
 Pittosporum viscidum
 Pittosporum wingii
 Pittosporum yunckeri A.C.Sm.

References

 
Apiales genera
Taxa named by Allan Cunningham (botanist)